Mesokampos (before 1926: Ορτά Ομπά - Orta Ompa) is a village in Florina Regional Unit, Macedonia, Greece.

The Greek census (1920) recorded 165 people in the village and in 1923 there were 165 inhabitants (or 33 families) who were Muslim. Following the Greek-Turkish population exchange, in 1926 within Orta Ompa there was 1 refugee family from East Thrace and 8 refugee families from Asia Minor. The Greek census (1928) recorded 179 village inhabitants. In 1928, there were 35 refugee families (181 people).

References 

Populated places in Florina (regional unit)